Jared Hassin (born December 17, 1989) is a former American football running back for the Army Black Knights. After transferring from the Air Force Academy to the Military Academy, Hassin rushed for 1,013 yards and scored nine touchdowns as a sophomore in 2010. He tied the Army school record in 2010 with four consecutive 100-yard rushing games. His output dropped in his junior and senior seasons, and he left the team with five games remaining in his senior year.

College statistics

References

1989 births
Living people
American football running backs
Army Black Knights football players
Players of American football from Wisconsin
People from Delafield, Wisconsin
Sportspeople from the Milwaukee metropolitan area
Military personnel from Wisconsin